Bhairava is a 1994 Indian Kannada language romantic action film written and directed by Raj Kishor and produced by N. Kumar. The film stars Jaggesh in the role of a speech impaired young man, Bhairava "Bhaira" , enslaved by his uncle and Vajramuni as the tyrannical uncle, Nanjegowda. Nandini Singh played the female lead while Doddanna and Pramila Joshai played other key roles. The film has a musical score by M. M. Keeravani.

The film portrays the life of Bhairava, a speech impaired man, almost enslaved and tortured by his uncle and considered to be an expendable by the villagers. His life takes a turn after he falls in love with a doctor and in the process gets to know certain shocking secrets which forces him to unite the villagers and rebel against his master.

Cast 
Jaggesh
Nandini Singh
Vajramuni
Pramila Joshai
Doddanna
Killer Venkatesh 
Ratnakar

Soundtrack 
Chandana Seere Chandana
Love Lovuve 
Kannada Mandidinu

References 

Indian action comedy films
Films scored by M. M. Keeravani
1990s Kannada-language films
1994 action comedy films